The Safavid Campaign of 1554–1555 was the final bout of hostilities between the Ottomans and the Safavids during the Ottoman-Safavid War of 1532–1555. It was launched by Suleiman the Magnificent (r. 1520–1566), and took place between June 1554 and May 1555. It was part of the wider Sunni–Shia conflict.

Background
The campaign was triggered by the 1550–1552 Safavid attacks in eastern Anatolia which devastated Van and Erzurum, and left many Sunnis dead. In a letter dated July 1554, the Ottomans invited the Safavids to battle, then repeated the famous fatwa of Ibn Kemal. The campaign, which was the third expedition during the war, and was led by Suleiman himself and Governor-General of Rumelia Sokollu Mehmed Pasha, and included forces from the Balkans (the Rumelia Eyalet). The Balkan forces were stationed at Tokat and spent the winter of 1553–1554 there, then in June 1554 joined up with the Sultan's Army coming from Aleppo in Suşehri. The Balkan forces took part in the whole campaign.

The campaign
The Ottomans raided Safavid Azerbaijan and killed both Sunni and Shia. Safavid palaces, villas and gardens were destroyed, and Yerevan, Karabakh and Nakhchivan were captured by the Ottomans. The Mahmudi tribe in Van (not subdued by the Ottomans during the Ottoman capture of Van in 1548) under their leader Hasan, until then loyal to the Safavids, switched sides to the Ottomans following the attack on Azerbaijan in 1554. Ebussuud, the Ottoman chief jurisconsult (şeyhülislâm), issued a fatwa in 1554 that endorsed the enslavement of Safavid captives, and contrary to previous practice, they could be sold like non-Muslims. The Safavids did not enslave Ottoman subjects, but executed them. Suleiman's army took thousands of captives in Nakhchivan in July 1554. Ebussuud's fatwa did however assert that the enslavement of captured Kizilbaş (Shia) children in Nakhchivan was not lawful. Suleiman threatened to destroy Ardabil and its shrine if Safavid intrusions did not stop. Both sides had terrible losses, with no outright victor.

Aftermath
Suleiman received a Safavid delegation at his winter quarters in Amasya to negotiate peace.

Regarding territory, a Safavid recognition of Ottoman rule in Iraq and eastern Anatolia would return Yerevan, Karabakh and Nakhchivan. Regarding religious matters, the Safavids were promised that Shia pilgrims would not be prevented on visiting their sanctuaries in Ottoman territory, on the condition of Safavid abolition of tabarru.

The Peace was signed at Amasya and brought half a century of Ottoman-Safavid war to an end. With the conclusion of hostilities in May 1555, the commanders Malkoçoğlu Balı Bey and their forces were permitted to return to Rumelia. Ottoman–Safavid correspondence following the war was friendly.

References

Sources
Books

Journals

Further reading
 

Conflicts in 1554
Conflicts in 1555
1550s in the Ottoman Empire
16th century in Iran
16th century in Azerbaijan
16th century in Armenia
Massacres in Iran
Shia–Sunni sectarian violence
Wars involving the Ottoman Empire
Wars involving Safavid Iran
Ottoman–Persian Wars